Itana Čavlović  (born 27 August 1997) is a professional Montenegrin handball player who plays for the club  CS Rapid București (handball).

References

1997 births
Living people
Montenegrin female handball players
Sportspeople from Podgorica